Benchmark may refer to:

Business and economics
 Benchmarking, evaluating performance within organizations
 Benchmark price
 Benchmark (crude oil), oil-specific practices

Science and technology
 Benchmark (surveying), a point of known elevation marked for the purpose of surveying
 Benchmarking (geolocating), an activity involving finding benchmarks
 Benchmark (computing), the result of running a computer program to assess performance
 Benchmark, a best-performing, or gold standard test in medicine and statistics

Companies
 Benchmark Electronics, an electronics manufacturer
 Benchmark (venture capital firm), a venture capital firm
 Benchmark Recordings, a music label with CDs by the Fabulous Thunderbirds and Mike Bloomfield

Other uses
 Benchmarking (journal), a bimonthly peer-reviewed academic journal relating to the field of quality management
 McAfee's Benchmark, a brand of bourbon
 Benchmark (game show), on UK Channel 4

See also
 Specification (technical standard)